Fritz Kwabena Poku (born 1945) is a Ghanaian diplomat. Poku was the ambassador to the United States (concurrently to Mexico, Guatemala, Belize, Haiti and Bahamas) from July 2004 to 2006. Poku is married with four children.

Sources
 Fritz Kwabena Poku GhanaWeb.com

Living people
Ambassadors of Ghana to the United States
Ambassadors of Ghana to Mexico
Ambassadors of Ghana to Guatemala
High Commissioners of Ghana to Belize
Ambassadors of Ghana to Haiti
High Commissioners of Ghana to the Bahamas
1935 births